Persatuan Sepakbola Indonesia Gunung Kidul (commonly known as Persig Gunung Kidul) is an Indonesian football club from Gunung Kidul Regency, Special Region of Yogyakarta. Currently Persig Gunungkidul competes in the Indonesian League Third Division DIY zone, Liga 3.

Grounds
Gelora Handayani Stadium is the home base of this club. Gelora Handayani Stadium is a multi-purpose stadium in Wonosari, Indonesia. It is currently used mostly for soccer matches and also sometimes for athletics. The stadium has a capacity of 10,000.

Supporters
Persig is not very popular football club in Indonesia. But they have an several fanatic supporter groups. They are named Supergeni, GardapatiGK, The Guident, The Hanter.

References

External links 

Gunung Kidul Regency
Football clubs in the Special Region of Yogyakarta
Football clubs in Indonesia
Association football clubs established in 1976
1976 establishments in Indonesia